The Indo-European migrations were hypothesized migrations of Proto-Indo-European language (PIE) speakers, and subsequent migrations of people speaking derived Indo-European languages, which took place approx. 4000 to 1000 BCE, potentially explaining how these languages came to be spoken across a large area of Eurasia, from India and Iran, to Europe.

While there can be no direct evidence of prehistoric languages, a synthesis of linguistics, archaeology, anthropology and genetics establishes both the existence of Proto-Indo-European and the spread of its daughter dialects through migrations of large populations of its speakers, as well as the recruitment of new speakers through emulation of conquering elites. Comparative linguistics describes the similarities between various languages and the laws of systematic change, which allow the reconstruction of ancestral speech (see Indo-European studies). Archaeology traces the spread of artifacts, habitations, and burial sites presumed to be created by speakers of Proto-Indo-European in several stages: from the hypothesized locations of the Proto-Indo-European homeland, into their later locations of Western Europe, Central, South and Eastern Asia. These changes occurred by migrations and by language shift through elite-recruitment as described by anthropological research. Recent genetic research has increasingly contributed to understanding the kinship relations among prehistoric cultures.

According to the widely held Kurgan hypothesis, or renewed Steppe hypothesis, the oldest migration branch produced the Anatolian languages (Hittite language and Luwian language) which split from the earliest proto-Indo-European speech community (archaic PIE) inhabiting the Volga basin. The second-oldest branch language group, Tocharian, was spoken in the Tarim Basin (now western China), after splitting from early PIE spoken on the eastern Pontic steppe. The bulk of the Indo-European languages developed from late PIE, which was spoken within the Yamnaya horizon on the Pontic–Caspian steppe around 3000 BCE.

Proto-Celtic and Proto-Italic may have developed from Indo-European languages coming from Central Europe to Western Europe after the 3rd millennium BCE Yamnaya migrations into the Danube Valley, while Proto-Germanic and Proto-Balto-Slavic may have developed east of the Carpathian mountains, in present-day Ukraine, moving north and spreading with the Corded Ware culture in Middle Europe (third millennium BCE).

The Proto-Indo-Iranian language and culture probably emerged within the Sintashta culture (circa 2100–1800 BCE), at the eastern border of the Abashevo culture, which in turn developed from the Corded Ware-related Fatyanovo-Balanovo culture. The Sintashta culture grew into the Andronovo culture (ca. 1900–800 BCE), the two first phases being the Fedorovo Andronovo culture (ca. 1900–1400 BCE) and Alakul Andronovo culture (ca. 1800–1500 BCE). Indo-Aryans moved into the Bactria–Margiana Archaeological Complex (ca. 2400–1600 BCE) and spread to the Levant (Mitanni), northern India (Vedic people, ca. 1700 BCE). The Iranian languages spread back throughout the steppes with the Scyths, and into Ancient Iran with the Medes, Parthians and Persians from ca. 800 BCE.

A number of alternative theories have been proposed, most notably the Anatolian hypothesis and the Armenian hypothesis. Renfrew's Anatolian hypothesis suggests a much earlier date for the Indo-European languages, proposing an origin in Anatolia and an initial spread with the earliest farmers who migrated to Europe. It has been the only serious alternative for the steppe-theory, but suffers from a lack of explanatory power. The Anatolian hypothesis also led to some support for the Armenian hypothesis, which proposes that the Urheimat of the Indo-European language was south of the Caucasus. While the Armenian hypothesis has been criticized on archeological and chronological grounds, recent genetic research has revived debate.

Fundamentals

Linguistics: relations between languages

Indo-European languages

The Dutch scholar Marcus Zuerius van Boxhorn (1612–1653) noted similarities between various European languages, Sanskrit, and Persian. Over a century later, after learning Sanskrit in India, Sir William Jones detected equivalent correspondences; he described them in his Third Anniversary Discourse to the Asiatic Society in 1786, concluding that all these languages originated from the same source. From his initial intuitions there developed the hypothesis of an Indo-European language family consisting of several hundred related languages and dialects. The 2009 Ethnologue estimates a total of about 439 Indo-European languages and dialects, about half of these (221) belonging to the Indo-Aryan subbranch based in South Asia. The Indo-European family includes most of the major current languages of Europe, of the Iranian plateau, of the northern half of the Indian Subcontinent, and of Sri Lanka, with kindred languages also formerly spoken in parts of ancient Anatolia and of Central Asia. With written attestations appearing from the Bronze Age in the form of the Anatolian languages and Mycenaean Greek, the Indo-European family is significant in historical linguistics as possessing the second-longest recorded history, after the Afroasiatic family.

Almost 3 billion native speakers use Indo-European languages, making them by far the largest recognised language family. Of the 20 languages with the largest numbers of native speakers according to Ethnologue, twelve are Indo-European – Spanish, English, Hindi, Portuguese, Bengali, Russian, German, Punjabi, Marathi, French, Urdu, and Italian – accounting for over 1.7 billion native speakers.

Development of the Indo-European languages

Proto-Indo-European language

The (late) Proto-Indo-European language (PIE) is the linguistic reconstruction of a common ancestor of the Indo-European languages, as spoken by the Proto-Indo-Europeans after the split-off of Anatolian and Tocharian. PIE was the first proposed proto-language to be widely accepted by linguists. Far more work has gone into reconstructing it than any other proto-language and it is by far the most well-understood of all proto-languages of its age. During the 19th century, the vast majority of linguistic work was devoted to reconstruction of Proto-Indo-European or its daughter proto-languages such as Proto-Germanic, and most of the current techniques of historical linguistics (e. g. the comparative method and the method of internal reconstruction) were developed as a result.

Scholars estimate that PIE may have been spoken as a single language (before divergence began) around 3500 BCE, though estimates by different authorities can vary by more than a millennium. The most popular hypothesis for the origin and spread of the language is the Kurgan hypothesis, which postulates an origin in the Pontic–Caspian steppe of Eastern Europe.

The existence of PIE was first postulated in the 18th century by Sir William Jones, who observed the similarities between Sanskrit, Ancient Greek, and Latin. By the early 20th century, well-defined descriptions of PIE had been developed that are still accepted today (with some refinements). The largest developments of the 20th century have been the discovery of Anatolian and Tocharian languages and the acceptance of the laryngeal theory. The Anatolian languages have also spurred a major re-evaluation of theories concerning the development of various shared Indo-European language features and the extent to which these features were present in PIE itself.

PIE is thought to have had a complex system of morphology that included inflections (suffixing of roots, as in who, whom, whose), and ablaut (vowel alterations, as in sing, sang, sung). Nouns used a sophisticated system of declension and verbs used a similarly sophisticated system of conjugation.

Pre-Proto-Indo-European

Relationships to other language families, including the Uralic languages, have been proposed but remain controversial. There is no written evidence of Proto-Indo-European, so all knowledge of the language is derived by reconstruction from later languages using linguistic techniques such as the comparative method and the method of internal reconstruction. Most linguists recognize there is a limit to linguistic reconstruction, and that reconstructing an ancestral language to Proto-Indo-European might not be possible.

The Indo-Hittite hypothesis postulates a common predecessor which both the Anatolian languages and the other Indo-European languages came from, called Proto-Indo-Hittite. Although PIE logically had predecessors, the Indo-Hittite hypothesis is not widely accepted, and there is little to suggest that it is possible to reconstruct a Proto-Indo-Hittite stage that differs substantially from what is already reconstructed for PIE.

Frederik Kortlandt postulates a shared common ancestor of Indo-European and Uralic, Proto-Indo-Uralic, as a possible pre-PIE. According to Kortlandt, "Indo-European is a branch of Indo-Uralic which was radically transformed under the influence of a North Caucasian substratum when its speakers moved from the area north of the Caspian Sea to the area north of the Black Sea."

Uralic, Caucasian and Semitic borrowings
Proto-Finno-Ugric and PIE have a lexicon in common, generally related to trade, such as words for "price" and "draw, lead". Similarly, "sell" and "wash" were borrowed in Proto-Ugric. Although some have proposed a common ancestor (the hypothetical Nostratic macrofamily), this is generally regarded as the result of intensive borrowing, which suggests that their homelands were located near each other. Proto-Indo-European also exhibits lexical loans to or from Caucasian languages, particularly Proto-Northwest Caucasian and Proto-Kartvelian, which suggests a location close to the Caucasus.

Gramkelidze and Ivanov, using the now largely unsupported glottalic theory of Indo-European phonology, also proposed Semitic borrowings into Proto-Indo-European, suggesting a more southern homeland to explain these borrowings. According to Mallory and Adams, some of these borrowings may be too speculative or from a later date, but they consider the proposed Semitic loans *táwros 'bull' and *wéyh₁on- 'wine; vine' to be more likely. Anthony notes that those Semitic borrowings may also have occurred through the advancement of Anatolian farmer cultures via the Danube valley into the steppe zone.

Phases of Proto-Indo-European

According to Anthony, the following terminology may be used:
 Archaic PIE for "the last common ancestor of the Anatolian and non-Anatolian IE branches";
 Early, core, or Post-Anatolian, PIE for "the last common ancestor of the non-Anatolian PIE languages, including Tocharian";
 Late PIE for "the common ancestor of all other IE branches".

The Anatolian languages are the first Indo-European language family to have split off from the main group. Due to the archaic elements preserved in the now extinct Anatolian languages, they may be a "cousin" of Proto-Indo-European, instead of a "daughter", but Anatolian is generally regarded as an early offshoot of the Indo-European language group.

Phylogenetic analysis of Indo-European languages
Using a mathematical analysis borrowed from evolutionary biology, but basing their work on comparative vocabulary, a number of researchers have attempted to estimate the dates of the splitting up of the various Indo-European languages. According to the latest study by Kassian et al. (2021), Hittite was the earliest language to split off from the rest, around 4139–3450 BC, followed by Tocharian around 3727–2262 BC. Subsequently Indo-European split into four branches ca. 3357–2162 BC: (1) Greek-Armenian, (2) Albanian, (3) Italic-Germanic-Celtic, (4) Balto-Slavic–Indo-Iranian. Balto-Slavic split from Indo-Iranian around 2723–1790 BC, Italic-Germanic-Celtic broke up around 2655–1537 BC, and Indo-Iranian split up around 2044–1458 BC. The position of Albanian is not completely clear, from an insufficiency of evidence.

The authors point out that these dates, which are only approximate, are not inconsistent with the dates established by other methods for the various archaeological cultures which are thought to be associated with Indo-European languages. For example, the date for the Tocharian break-off corresponds to the migration that gave rise to the Afanasievo culture; the date for the Balto-Slavic–Indo-Iranian break-up may be correlated with the end of Corded Ware culture around 2100 or 2000 BC; and the date for Indo-Iranian corresponds to that of the Sintashta archaeological culture, frequently associated with Proto-Indo-Iranian speakers.

Archaeology: migrations from the steppe Urheimat 

Archaeological research has unearthed a broad range of historical cultures that can be related to the spread of the Indo-European languages. Various steppe-cultures show strong similarities with the Yamna-horizon at the Pontic steppe, while the time-range of several Asian cultures also coincides with the proposed trajectory and time-range of the Indo-European migrations.

According to the widely accepted Kurgan hypothesis or Steppe theory, the Indo-European language and culture spread in several stages from the Proto-Indo-European Urheimat in the Eurasian Pontic steppes into Western Europe, Central and South Asia, through folk migrations and so-called elite recruitment. This process started with the introduction of cattle at the Eurasian steppes around 5200 BCE, and the mobilisation of the steppe herder cultures with the introduction of wheeled wagons and horse-back riding, which led to a new kind of culture. Between 4500 and 2500 BCE, this "horizon", which includes several distinctive cultures culminating in the Yamnaya culture, spread out over the Pontic steppes, and outside into Europe and Asia. Anthony regards the Khvalynsk culture as the culture that established the roots of Early Proto-Indo-European around 4500 BCE in the lower and middle Volga.

Early migrations at ca. 4200 BCE brought steppe herders into the lower Danube valley, either causing or taking advantage of the collapse of Old Europe. According to Anthony, the Anatolian branch, to which the Hittites belong, probably arrived in Anatolia from the Danube valley.

Migrations eastward from the Repin culture founded the Afanasevo culture which developed into the Tocharians. The Tarim mummies were thought to represent a migration of Tocharian speakers from the Afanasevo culture into the Tarim Basin. yet a 2021 study demonstrates that the mummies are remains of locals descending from Ancient North Eurasians and ancient Northeast Asians; meanwhile, the study suggests instead that Afanasevo migrants might have introduced Proto-Tocharian into Dzungaria during the Early Bronze Age before Tocharian languages were recorded in Buddhist texts dating to 500-1000 CE in the Tarim basin. Migrations southward may have founded the Maykop culture, but the Maykop origins could also have been in the Caucasus.

Late PIE is related to the Yamnaya culture. Proposals for its origins point to both the eastern Khvalynsk and the western Sredny Stog culture; according to Anthony it originated in the Don-Volga area at ca. 3400 BCE.

The western Indo-European languages (Germanic, Celtic, Italic) probably spread into Europe from the Balkan-Danubian complex, a set of cultures in Southeastern Europe. At ca. 3000 BCE a migration of Proto-Indo-European speakers from the Yamna-culture took place toward the west along the Danube river, Slavic and Baltic developed a little later at the middle Dniepr (present-day Ukraine), moving north toward the Baltic coast. The Corded Ware culture in Middle Europe (third millennium BCE), which arose in the contact zone east of the Carpathian mountains, materialized with a massive migration from the Eurasian steppes to Central Europe, probably played a central role in the spread of the pre-Germanic and pre-Balto-Slavic dialects.

The eastern part of the Corded Ware culture contributed to the Sintashta culture (c. 2100–1800 BCE), where the Indo-Iranian language and culture emerged, and where the chariot was invented. The Indo-Iranian language and culture was further developed in the Andronovo culture (c. 1800–800 BCE), and influenced by the Bactria–Margiana Archaeological Complex (c. 2400–1600 BCE). The Indo-Aryans split off around 1800–1600 BCE from the Iranians, whereafter Indo-Aryan groups moved to the Levant (Mitanni), northern India (Vedic people, c. 1500 BCE), and China (Wusun). The Iranian languages spread throughout the steppes with the Scyths and into Iran with the Medes, Parthians and Persians from ca. 800 BCE.

Anthropology: Elite recruitment and language shift

According to Marija Gimbutas, the process of "Indo-Europeanization" of Europe was essentially a cultural, not a physical transformation. It is understood as a migration of Yamnaya people to Europe, as military victors, successfully imposing a new administrative system, language and religion upon the indigenous groups, who are referred to by Gimbutas as Old Europeans. The Yamnaya people's social organization, especially a patrilinear and patriarchal structure, greatly facilitated their effectiveness in war. According to Gimbutas, the social structure of Old Europe "contrasted with the Indo-European Kurgans who were mobile and non-egalitarian" and who had a hierarchically organised tripartite social structure; the IE were warlike, lived in smaller villages at times, and had an ideology that centered on the virile male, reflected also in their pantheon. In contrast, the indigenous groups of Old Europe had neither a warrior class nor horses.

Indo-European languages probably spread through language shifts. Small groups can change a larger cultural area, and elite male dominance by small groups may have led to a language shift in northern India.

It is thought that when Indo-Europeans expanded into Europe from the Pontic-Caspian steppe, they encountered existing populations that spoke dissimilar, unrelated languages. Based on evidence from presumably non-Indo-European lexicon in the European branches of Indo-European, Iversen and Kroonen (2017) postulate a group of "Early European Neolithic" languages that is associated with the Neolithic spread of agriculturalists into Europe. Early European Neolithic languages were supplanted with the arrival of Indo-Europeans, but according to Iversen and Kroonen left their trace in a layer of mostly agricultural vocabulary in the Indo-European languages of Europe.

According to Edgar Polomé, 30% of modern German derives from a non-Indo-European sub-stratum language spoken by people of the Funnelbeaker culture indigenous to southern Scandinavia. When Yamnaya Indo-European speakers came into contact with the indigenous peoples during the third millennium BCE, they came to dominate the local populations, yet parts of the indigenous lexicon persisted in the formation of Proto-Germanic, thus lending to the Germanic languages the status of Indo-Europeanized languages. Similarly, according to Marija Gimbutas, the Corded Ware culture, after migrating to Scandinavia, synthesized with the Funnelbeaker culture, giving birth to the Proto-Germanic language.

David Anthony, in his "revised Steppe hypothesis", conjectures that the spread of the Indo-European languages probably did not happen through "chain-type folk migrations", but by the introduction of these languages by ritual and political elites, which were emulated by large groups of people, a process which he calls "elite recruitment".

According to Parpola, local elites joined "small but powerful groups" of Indo-European-speaking migrants. These migrants had an attractive social system and good weapons, and luxury goods which marked their status and power. Joining these groups was attractive for local leaders, since it strengthened their position, and gave them additional advantages. These new members were further incorporated by matrimonial alliances.

According to Joseph Salmons, language shift is facilitated by "dislocation" of language communities, in which the elite is taken over. He observes that this change is facilitated by "systematic changes in community structure", in which a local community becomes incorporated in a larger social structure.

Genetic relations between historical populations
Since the 2000s genetic studies have been assuming a prominent role in the research on Indo-European migrations. Whole-genome studies reveal relations between the people associated with various cultures and the time-range in which those relations were established. Research by Haak et al. (2015) showed that ~75% of the ancestry of Corded Ware-related people came from Yamna-related populations, while Allentoft et al. (2015) shows that the people of the Sintashta culture are genetically related to those of the Corded Ware culture.

Ecological studies: widespread drought, urban collapse, and pastoral migrations
Climate change and drought may have triggered both the initial dispersal of Indo-European speakers, and the migration of Indo-Europeans from the steppes in south central Asia and India.

Around 4200–4100 BCE a climate change occurred, manifesting in colder winters in Europe. Steppe herders, archaic Proto-Indo-European speakers, spread into the lower Danube valley about 4200–4000 BCE, either causing or taking advantage of the collapse of Old Europe.

The Yamnaya horizon was an adaptation to a climate change that occurred between 3500 and 3000 BCE, in which the steppes became drier and cooler. Herds needed to be moved frequently to feed them sufficiently, and the use of wagons and horse riding made this possible, leading to "a new, more mobile form of pastoralism".

In the second millennium BCE widespread aridization led to water shortages and ecological changes in both the Eurasian steppes and south Asia. At the steppes, humidization led to a change of vegetation, triggering "higher mobility and transition to the nomadic cattle breeding". Water shortage also had a strong impact in south Asia, "causing the collapse of sedentary urban cultures in south central Asia, Afghanistan, Iran, and India, and triggering large-scale migrations".

Origins of the Indo-Europeans

Urheimat (original homeland)

The Proto-Indo-European Urheimat hypotheses are tentative identifications of the Urheimat, or primary homeland, of the hypothetical Proto-Indo-European language. Such identifications attempt to be consistent with the glottochronology of the language tree and with the archaeology of those places and times. Identifications are made on the basis of how well, if at all, the projected migration routes and times of migration fit the distribution of Indo-European languages, and how closely the sociological model of the original society reconstructed from Proto-Indo-European lexical items fits the archaeological profile. All hypotheses assume a significant period (at least 1500–2000 years) between the time of the Proto-Indo-European language and the earliest attested texts, at Kültepe, c. 19th century BCE.

The Kurgan hypothesis and the "revised steppe theory"

Since the early 1980s the mainstream consensus among Indo-Europeanists favors Marija Gimbutas' "Kurgan hypothesis", c.q. David Anthony's "Revised Steppe theory", derived from Gimbutas' pioneering work, placing the Indo-European homeland in the Pontic steppe, more specifically, between the Dniepr (Ukraine) and the Ural river (Russia), of the Chalcolithic period (4th to 5th millennia BCE), where various related cultures developed.

The Pontic steppe is a large area of grasslands in far Eastern Europe, located north of the Black Sea, Caucasus Mountains and Caspian Sea and including parts of eastern Ukraine, southern Russia and northwest Kazakhstan. This is the time and place of the earliest domestication of the horse, which according to this hypothesis was the work of early Indo-Europeans, allowing them to expand outwards and assimilate or conquer many other cultures.

The Kurgan hypothesis (also theory or model) argues that the people of an archaeological "Kurgan culture" (a term grouping the Yamnaya or Pit Grave culture and its predecessors) in the Pontic steppe were the most likely speakers of the Proto-Indo-European language. The term is derived from kurgan, a Turkic loanword in Russian for a tumulus or burial mound. An origin at the Pontic-Caspian steppes is the most widely accepted scenario of Indo-European origins.

Marija Gimbutas formulated her Kurgan hypothesis in the 1950s, grouping together a number of related cultures at the Pontic steppes. She defined the "Kurgan culture" as composed of four successive periods, with the earliest (Kurgan I) including the Samara and Seroglazovo cultures of the Dnieper/Volga region in the Copper Age (early 4th millennium BCE). The bearers of these cultures were nomadic pastoralists, who, according to the model, by the early 3rd millennium expanded throughout the Pontic–Caspian steppe and into Eastern Europe.

Gimbutas' grouping is nowadays considered to have been too broad. According to Anthony, it is better to speak of the Yamnaya culture or of a "Yamnaya horizon", which included several related cultures, as the defining Proto-Indo-European culture at the Pontic steppe. David Anthony has incorporated recent developments in his "revised steppe theory", which also supports a steppe origin of the Indo-European languages. Anthony emphasizes the Yamnaya culture (3300–2500 BCE), which according to him started on the middle Don and Volga, as the origin of the Indo-European dispersal, but regards Khvalynsk archaeological culture since around 4500 BCE as the oldest phase of Proto-Indo-European in the lower and middle Volga, a culture that kept domesticated sheep, goats, cattle and maybe horses. Recent research by Haak et al. (2015) confirms the migration of Yamnaya-people into western Europe, forming the Corded Ware culture.

A recent analysis by Anthony (2019) also suggests a genetic origin of proto-Indo-Europeans (of the Yamnaya culture) in the Eastern European steppe north of the Caucasus, deriving from a mixture of Eastern European Hunter-Gatherers (EHGs) and hunter-gatherers from the Caucasus (CHGs). Anthony additionally suggests that the proto-Indo-European language formed mainly from a base of languages spoken by Eastern European hunter-gatherers with influences from languages of northern Caucasus hunter-gatherers, in addition to a possible later, and minor, influence from the language of the Maikop culture to the south (which is hypothesized to have belonged to the North Caucasian family) in the later Neolithic or Bronze Age involving little genetic impact.

Anatolian hypothesis

The primary competitor is the Anatolian hypothesis advanced by Colin Renfrew, which states that the Indo-European languages began to spread peacefully into Europe from Asia Minor (modern Turkey) from around 7000 BCE with the Neolithic advance of farming by demic diffusion (wave of advance). Accordingly, most of the inhabitants of Neolithic Europe would have spoken Indo-European languages, and later migrations would at best have replaced these Indo-European varieties with other Indo-European varieties. The main strength of the farming hypothesis lies in its linking of the spread of Indo-European languages with an archaeologically known event (the spread of farming) that is often assumed as involving significant population shifts. Nevertheless, these days the Anatolian hypothesis is generally rejected, since it is incompatible with the growing data on the genetic history of the Yamnaya-people.

Armenian hypothesis

Another theory which has drawn considerable, and renewed, attention is the Armenian plateau hypothesis of Gamkrelidze and Ivanov, who have argued that the Urheimat was south of the Caucasus, specifically, "within eastern Anatolia, the southern Caucasus and northern Mesopotamia" in the fifth to fourth millennia BCE. Their proposal was based on a disputed theory of glottal consonants in PIE. According to Gamkrelidze and Ivanov, PIE words for material culture objects imply contact with more advanced peoples to the south, the existence of Semitic loan-words in PIE, Kartvelian (Georgian) borrowings from PIE, some contact with Sumerian, Elamite and others. However, given that the glottalic theory never caught on and there was little archaeological support, the Gamkrelidze and Ivanov theory did not gain support until Renfrew's Anatolian theory revived aspects of their proposal.

Proto-Indo-Europeans

The Proto-Indo-Europeans were the speakers of the Proto-Indo-European language (PIE), a reconstructed prehistoric language of Eurasia. Knowledge of them comes chiefly from the linguistic reconstruction, along with material evidence from archaeology and archaeogenetics.

Characteristics
According to some archaeologists, PIE speakers cannot be assumed to have been a single, identifiable people or tribe, but were a group of loosely related populations ancestral to the later, still partially prehistoric, Bronze Age Indo-Europeans. This view is held especially by those archaeologists who posit an original homeland of vast extent and immense time depth. However, this view is not shared by linguists, as proto-languages generally occupy small geographical areas over a very limited time span, and are generally spoken by close-knit communities such as a single small tribe.

The Proto-Indo-Europeans were likely to have lived during the late Neolithic, or roughly the 4th millennium BCE. Mainstream scholarship places them in the forest-steppe zone immediately to the north of the western end of the Pontic–Caspian steppe in Eastern Europe. Some archaeologists would extend the time depth of PIE to the middle Neolithic (5500 to 4500 BCE) or even the early Neolithic (7500 to 5500 BCE), and suggest alternative Proto-Indo-European original homelands.

By the late third millennium BCE, offshoots of the Proto-Indo-Europeans had reached Anatolia (Hittites), the Aegean (Mycenaean Greece), Western Europe, and southern Siberia (Afanasevo culture).

Origins of Proto-Indo-Europeans

The proto-Indo-Europeans, i.e. the Yamnaya people and the related cultures, seem to have been a mix from Eastern European hunter-gatherers; and people related to the Near East, i.e. Caucasus hunter-gatherers (CHG) i.e. Iran Chalcolithic people with a Caucasian hunter-gatherer component. Where this CHG-component came from is unknown; the mix of EHG and CHG may result from "an existing natural genetic gradient running from EHG far to the north to CHG/Iran in the south," or it may be explained as "the result of Iranian/CHG-related ancestry reaching the steppe zone independently and prior to a stream of AF [Anatolian Farmer] ancestry," reaching the steppes with people who migrated northwards into the steppes between 5,000 and 3,000 BCE.

Origins of archaic PIE
Different possibilities exist regarding the genesis of archaic PIE. While the consensus is that early and late PIE languages originated on the Pontic steppes, the location of the origin of archaic PIE has become the focus of renewed attention, due to the question where the CHG-component came from, and if they were the carriers of archaic PIE. Some suggest an origin of Archaic PIE from languages of the (EHG) hunter-gatherers of the Eastern European/Eurasian Steppe, some suggest an origin in or south of the Caucasus, and others suggest a mixed origin from the languages of both aforementioned regions.

Caucasus origins
Some recent DNA-research has led to renewed suggestions, most notably by David Reich, of a Caucasian homeland for archaic or 'proto-proto-Indo-European', from where archaic PIE speaking people migrated into Anatolia, where the Anatolian languages developed, while at the steppes archaic PIE developed into early and late PIE.

Anthony (2019, 2020) criticizes the Southern/Caucasian origin proposals of Reich and Kristiansen, and rejects the possibility that the Bronze Age Maykop people of the Caucasus were a southern source of language and genetics of Indo-European. According to Anthony, referring to Wang et al. (2018), the Maykop-culture had little genetic impact on the Yamnaya, whose paternal lineages were found to differ from those found in Maykop remains, but were instead related to those of earlier Eastern European hunter-gatherers. Also, the Maykop (and other contemporary Caucasus samples), along with CHG from this date, had significant Anatolian Farmer ancestry "which had spread into the Caucasus from the west after about 5000 BC", while the Yamnaya had a lower percentage which does not fit with a Maykop origin. Partly for these reasons, Anthony concludes that Bronze Age Caucasus groups such as the Maykop "played only a minor role, if any, in the formation of Yamnaya ancestry." According to Anthony, the roots of Proto-Indo-European (archaic or proto-proto-Indo-European) were mainly in the steppe rather than the south. Anthony considers it likely that the Maykop spoke a Northern Caucasian language not ancestral to Indo-European.

Indo-Uralic Urheimat
Bomhard's alternative Caucasian substrate hypothesis proposes a "north-Caspian Indo-Uralic" Urheimat, involving an origin of PIE from the contact of two languages; a Eurasian steppe language from the north Caspian (related to Uralic) which acquired a substratal influence from a northwest Caucasian language. According to Anthony (2019), a genetic relationship to Uralic is unlikely and cannot be reliably proven; similarities between Uralic and Indo-European would be explained by early borrowings and influence.

Steppe origins with south Caspian CHG-influences
Anthony argues that proto-Indo European formed mainly from the languages of Eastern European hunter-gatherers with influences from those of Caucasus hunter-gatherers, and suggests that the archaic proto-Indo-European language formed in the Volga Basin (in the Eastern European Steppe). It developed from a base of languages spoken by Eastern European hunter-gatherers at the Volga steppe plains, with some influences from languages of northern Caucasus hunter-gatherers who migrated from the Caucasus to the lower Volga. Additionally, there is possible later influence, involving little genetic impact, in the later Neolithic or Bronze Age from the language of the Maykop culture to the south, which is hypothesized to have belonged to the North Caucasian family. According to Anthony, hunting-fishing camps from the lower Volga, dated 6200–4500 BCE, could be the remains of people who contributed the CHG-component, similar to the Hotu cave, migrating from northwestern Iran or Azerbaijan via the western Caspian coast. They mixed with EHG-people from the northern Volga steppes, forming the Khvalynsk culture, which "might represent the oldest phase of PIE.". The resulting culture contributed to the Sredny Stog culture, a predecessor of the Yamnaya culture.

Archaic Proto-Indo-European

Pre-Yamnaya steppe cultures

According to Anthony, the development of the Proto-Indo-European cultures started with the introduction of cattle at the Pontic-Caspian steppes. Until ca. 5200–5000 BCE the Pontic-Caspian steppes were populated by hunter-gatherers. According to Anthony, the first cattle herders arrived from the Danube Valley at ca. 5800–5700 BCE, descendants from the first European farmers. They formed the Criş culture (5800–5300 BCE), creating a cultural frontier at the Prut-Dniestr watershed. The adjacent Bug–Dniester culture (6300–5500 BCE) was a local culture, from where cattle breeding spread to the steppe peoples. The Dniepr Rapids area was the next part of the Pontic-Caspian steppes to shift to cattle-herding. It was the densely populated area of the Pontic-Caspian steppes at the time, and had been inhabited by various hunter-gatherer populations since the end of the Ice Age. From ca.5800–5200 it was inhabited by the first phase of the Dnieper-Donets culture, a hunter-gatherer culture contemporaneous with the Bug-Dniestr culture.

At ca. 5200–5000 BCE the Cucuteni–Trypillia culture (6000–3500 BCE) (aka Tripolye culture), presumed to be non-Indo-European speaking, appears east of the Carpathian mountains,  moving the cultural frontier to the Southern Bug valley, while the foragers at the Dniepr Rapids shifted to cattle herding, marking the shift to Dniepr-Donets II (5200/5000 – 4400/4200 BCE). The Dniepr-Donets culture kept cattle not only for ritual sacrifices, but also for their daily diet. The Khvalynsk culture (4700–3800 BCE), located at the middle Volga, which was connected with the Danube Valley by trade networks, also had cattle and sheep, but they were "more important in ritual sacrifices than in the diet". The Samara culture (early 5th millennium BCE), north of the Khvalynsk culture, interacted with the Khvalynsk culture, while the archaeological findings seem related to those of the Dniepr-Donets II culture.

The Sredny Stog culture (4400–3300 BCE) appears at the same location as the Dniepr-Donets culture, but shows influences from people who came from the Volga river region. According to Vasiliev, the Khvalynsk and Sredny Stog cultures show strong similarities, suggesting "a broad Sredny Stog-Khvalynsk horizon embracing the entire Pontic-Caspian during the Eneolithic." From this horizon arose the Yamnaya culture, which also spread over the entire Pontic-Caspian steppe.

Europe: migration into the Danube Valley (4200 BCE)
According to Anthony, the Pre-Yamnaya steppe herders, archaic Proto-Indo-European speakers, spread into the lower Danube valley about 4200–4000 BCE, either causing or taking advantage of the collapse of Old Europe, their languages "probably included archaic Proto-Indo-European dialects of the kind partly preserved later in Anatolian." See Suvorovo culture and Ezero culture for details.

Anatolia: Archaic Proto-Indo-European (Hittites; 4500–3500 BCE)

The Anatolians were a group of distinct Indo-European peoples who spoke the Anatolian languages and shared a common culture. The Anatolians' earliest linguistic and historical attestation are as names mentioned in Assyrian mercantile texts from 19th-century BCE Kanesh.

The Anatolian languages were a branch of the larger Indo-European language family. The archaeological discovery of the archives of the Hittites and the classification of the Hittite language to a separate Anatolian branch of the Indo-European languages caused a sensation among historians, forcing a re-evaluation of Near Eastern history and Indo-European linguistics.

Origins
Damgaard et al. (2018) note that "[a]mong comparative linguists, a Balkan route for the introduction of Anatolian IE is generally considered more likely than a passage through the Caucasus, due, for example, to greater Anatolian IE presence and language diversity in the west."

Mathieson et al. note the absence of "large amounts" of steppe-ancestry in the Balkan peninsula and Anatolia, which may indicate that archaic PIE originated in the Caucasus or Iran, but also state that "it remains possible that Indo-European languages were spread through southeastern Europe into Anatolia without large-scale population movement or admixture."

Damgaard et al. (2018), found "no correlation between genetic ancestry and exclusive ethnic or political identities among the populations of Bronze Age Central Anatolia, as has previously been hypothesized." According to them, the Hittites lacked steppe-ancestry, arguing that "the Anatolian clade of IE languages did not derive from a large-scale Copper Age/Early Bronze Age population movement from the steppe," contrary Anthony's proposal of a large-scale migration via the Balkan as proposed in 2007. The first IE-speakers may have reached Anatolia "by way of commercial contacts and small-scale movement during the Bronze Age." They further state that their findings are "consistent with historical models of cultural hybridity and 'middle ground' in a multicultural and multilingual but genetically homogeneous Bronze Age Anatolia," as proposed by other researchers.

According to Kroonen et al. (2018), in the linguistic supplement to Damgaard et al. (2018), aDNA studies in Anatolia "show no indication of a large-scale intrusion of a steppe population", but do "fit the recently developed consensus among linguists and historians that the speakers of the Anatolian languages established themselves in Anatolia by gradual infiltration and cultural assimilation." They further note that this lends support to the Indo-Hittite hypothesis, according to which both proto-Anatolian and proto-Indo-European split-off from a common mother language "no later than the 4th millennium BCE."

Time-frame
Although the Hittites are first attested in the 2nd millennium BCE, the Anatolian branch seems to have separated at a very early stage from Proto-Indo-European, or may have developed from an older Pre-Proto-Indo-European ancestor. Considering a steppe origin for archaic PIE, together with the Tocharians the Anatolians constituted the first known dispersal of Indo-European out of the Eurasian steppe. Although those archaic PIE-speakers had wagons, they probably reached Anatolia before Indo-Europeans had learned to use chariots for war. It is likely that their arrival was one of gradual settlement and not as an invading army.

According to Mallory, it is likely that the Anatolians reached the Near East from the north, either via the Balkans or the Caucasus in the 3rd millennium BCE. According to Anthony, if it separated from Proto-Indo-European, it likely did so between 4500 and 3500 BCE. According to Anthony, descendants of archaic Proto-Indo-European steppe herders, who moved into the lower Danube valley about 4200–4000 BCE, later moved into Anatolia, at an unknown time, but maybe as early as 3,000 BCE. According to Parpola, the appearance of Indo-European speakers from Europe into Anatolia, and the appearance of Hittite, is related to later migrations of Proto-Indo-European speakers from the Yamna-culture into the Danube Valley at ca. 2800 BCE, which is in line with the "customary" assumption that the Anatolian Indo-European language was introduced into Anatolia somewhere in the third millennium BCE.

Hittite civilisation
The Hittites, who established an extensive empire in the Middle East in the 2nd millennium BCE, are by far the best-known members of the Anatolian group. The history of the Hittite civilization is known mostly from cuneiform texts found in the area of their kingdom, and from diplomatic and commercial correspondence found in various archives in Egypt and the Middle East. Despite the use of Hatti for their core territory, the Hittites should be distinguished from the Hattians, an earlier people who inhabited the same region (until the beginning of the 2nd millennium). The Hittite military made successful use of chariots. Although belonging to the Bronze Age, they were the forerunners of the Iron Age, developing the manufacture of iron artifacts from as early as the 14th century BCE, when letters to foreign rulers reveal the latter's demand for iron goods. The Hittite empire reached its height during the mid-14th century BCE under Suppiluliuma I, when it encompassed an area that included most of Asia Minor as well as parts of the northern Levant and Upper Mesopotamia. After 1180 BCE, amid the Bronze Age Collapse in the Levant associated with the sudden arrival of the Sea Peoples, the kingdom disintegrated into several independent "Neo-Hittite" city-states, some of which survived until as late as the 8th century BCE. The lands of the Anatolian peoples were successively invaded by a number of peoples and empires at high frequency: the Phrygians, Bithynians, the Medes, the Persians, the Greeks, the Galatian Celts, Romans and the Oghuz Turks. Many of these invaders settled in Anatolia, in some cases causing the extinction of the Anatolian languages. By the Middle Ages, all the Anatolian languages (and the cultures accompanying them) were extinct, although there may be lingering influences on the modern inhabitants of Anatolia, most notably Armenians.

Northern Caucasus: The Maykop culture (3700–3000 BCE)

The Maykop culture, c. 3700–3000 BCE, was a major Bronze Age archaeological culture in the Western Caucasus region of Southern Russia. It extends along the area from the Taman Peninsula at the Kerch Strait to near the modern border of Dagestan and southwards to the Kura River. The culture takes its name from a royal burial found in Maykop kurgan in the Kuban River valley.

According to Mallory and Adams, migrations southward founded the Maykop culture (c. 3500–2500 BCE). Yet, according to Mariya Ivanova the Maykop origins were on the Iranian Plateau, while kurgans from the beginning of the 4th millennium at Soyuqbulaq in Azerbaijan, which belong to the Leyla-Tepe culture, show parallels with the Maykop kurgans. According to Museyibli, "the Leylatepe Culture tribes migrated to the north in the mid-fourth millennium and played an important part in the rise of the Maikop Culture of the North Caucasus." This model was confirmed by a genetic study published in 2018, which attributed the origin of Maykop individuals to a migration of Eneolithic farmers from western Georgia towards the north side of the Caucasus. It has been suggested that the Maykop people spoke a North Caucasian, rather than an Indo-European, language.

Early Proto-Indo-European

Afanasevo culture (3500–2500 BCE)

The Afanasievo culture (3300 to 2500 BCE) is the earliest Eneolithic archaeological culture found until now in south Siberia, occupying the Minusinsk Basin, Altay and Eastern Kazakhstan. It originated with a migration of people from the pre-Yamnaya Repin culture, at the Don river, and is related to the Tocharians.

Radiocarbon gives dates as early as 3705 BCE on wooden tools and 2874 BCE on human remains for the Afanasievo culture. The earliest of these dates has now been rejected, giving a date of around 3300 BCE for the start of the culture.

The Tocharians

The Tocharians, or "Tokharians" ( or ) were inhabitants of medieval oasis city-states on the northern edge of the Tarim Basin (modern Xinjiang, China). Their Tocharian languages (a branch of the Indo-European family) are known from manuscripts from the 6th to 8th centuries CE, after which they were supplanted by the Turkic languages of the Uyghur tribes. These people were called "Tocharian" by late 19th-century scholars who identified them with the Tókharoi described by ancient Greek sources as inhabiting Bactria. Although this identification is now generally considered mistaken, the name has become customary.

The Tocharians are thought to have developed from the Afanasevo culture of Siberia (c. 3500–2500 BCE). It is believed that the Tarim mummies, dated from 1800 BCE, represent a migration of Tocharian speakers from the Afanasevo culture in the Tarim Basin in the early 2nd millennium BCE; however, a 2021 genetic study demonstrated the Tarim Mummies are remains of locals descending from Ancient North Eurasians and Northeast Asians, and instead suggested that "Tocharian may have been plausibly introduced to the Dzungarian Basin by Afanasievo migrants" -i.e. "the Afanasievo herders of the Altai–Sayan region in southern Siberia (3150–2750 BC), who in turn have close genetic ties with the Yamnaya (3500–2500 BC) of the Pontic–Caspian steppe located 3,000 km to the west"- before being recorded in 500–1000 CE's Buddhist scriptures.

The Indo-European eastward expansion in the 2nd millennium BCE had a significant influence on Chinese culture, introducing the chariot, horse burials, the domesticated horse, iron technology, and wheeled vehicles, fighting styles, head-and-hoof rituals, art motifs and myths. By the end of the 2nd millennium BCE, the dominant people as far east as the Altai Mountains southward to the northern outlets of the Tibetan Plateau were anthropologically Caucasian, with the northern part speaking Iranian Scythian languages and the southern parts Tocharian languages, having Mongoloid populations as their northeastern neighbors. These two groups were in competition with each other until the latter overcame the former. The turning point occurred around the 5th to 4th centuries BCE with a gradual Mongolization of Siberia, while Eastern Central Asia (East Turkistan) remained Caucasian and Indo-European-speaking until well into the 1st millennium CE.

The Yuezhi

The Sinologist Edwin G. Pulleyblank has suggested that the Yuezhi, the Wusun, the Dayuan, the Kangju and the people of Yanqi, could have been Tocharian-speaking. Of these the Yuezhi are generally held to have been Tocharians. The Yuezhi were originally settled in the arid grasslands of the eastern Tarim Basin area, in what is today Xinjiang and western Gansu, in China.

At the peak of their power in the 3rd century BC, the Yuezhi are believed to have dominated the areas north of the Qilian Mountains (including the Tarim Basin and Dzungaria), the Altai region, the greater part of Mongolia, and the upper waters of the Yellow River. This territory has been referred to as the Yuezhi Empire. Their eastern neighbors were the Donghu. While the Yuezhi were pressuring the Xiongnu from the west, the Donghu were doing the same from the east. A large number of peoples, including the Wusun, the states of the Tarim Basin, and possibly the Qiang, were under the control of the Yuezhi. They were considered the predominant power in Central Asia. Evidence from Chinese records indicate the peoples of Central Asia as far west as the Parthian Empire were under the sway of the Yuezhi. This means that the territory of the Yuezhi Empire roughly corresponded to that of the later First Turkic Khaganate. The Pazyryk burials of the Ukok Plateau coincide with the apex of power of the Yuezhi, and the burials have therefore been attributed to them, which means that the Altai region was part of the Yuezhi Empire.

After the Yuezhi were defeated by the Xiongnu, in the 2nd century BCE, a small group, known as the Little Yuezhi, fled to the south, later spawning the Jie people who dominated the Later Zhao until their complete extermination by Ran Min in the Wei–Jie war. The majority of the Yuezhi however migrated west to the Ili Valley, where they displaced the Sakas (Scythians). Driven from the Ili Valley shortly afterwards by the Wusun, the Yuezhi migrated to Sogdia and then Bactria, where they are often identified with the Tókharoi (Τοχάριοι) and Asioi of Classical sources. They then expanded into northern South Asia, where one branch of the Yuezhi founded the Kushan Empire. The Kushan empire stretched from Turfan in the Tarim Basin to Pataliputra on the Gangetic plain at its greatest extent, and played an important role in the development of the Silk Road and the transmission of Buddhism to China. Tocharian languages continued to be spoken in the city-states of the Tarim Basin, only becoming extinct in the Middle Ages.

Late Proto-Indo-European
Late PIE is related to the Yamnaya culture and expansion, from which all IE-languages except the Anatolian languages and Tocharian descend.

Yamnaya-culture

The Khvalynsk culture (4700–3800 BCE) (middle Volga) and the Don-based Repin culture (ca.3950–3300 BCE) in the eastern Pontic-Caspian steppe, and the closely related Sredny Stog culture (c.4500–3500 BCE) in the western Pontic-Caspian steppe, preceded the Yamnaya culture (3300–2500 BCE). According to Anthony, the Yamnaya culture originated in the Don-Volga area at ca. 3400 BCE, arguing that late pottery from these two cultures can barely be distinguished from early Yamnaya pottery.

The Yamnaya horizon (a.k.a. Pit Grave culture) spread quickly across the Pontic-Caspian steppes between ca. 3400 and 3200 BCE. It was an adaptation to a climate change that occurred between 3500 and 3000 BCE, in which the steppes became drier and cooler. Herds needed to be moved frequently to feed them sufficiently, and the use of wagons and horse-back riding made this possible, leading to "a new, more mobile form of pastoralism". It was accompanied by new social rules and institutions, to regulate the local migrations in the steppes, creating a new social awareness of a distinct culture, and of "cultural Others" who did not participate in these new institutions.

According to Anthony, "the spread of the Yamnaya horizon was the material expression of the spread of late Proto-Indo-European across the Pontic-Caspian steppes." Anthony further notes that "the Yamnaya horizon is the visible archaeological expression of a social adjustment to high mobility – the invention of the political infrastructure to manage larger herds from mobile homes based in the steppes." The Yamnaya horizon represents the classical reconstructed Proto-Indo-European society with stone idols, predominantly practising animal husbandry in permanent settlements protected by hillforts, subsisting on agriculture, and fishing along rivers. According to Gimbutas, contact of the Yamnaya horizon with late Neolithic Europe cultures results in the "kurganized" Globular Amphora and Baden cultures. Anthony excludes the Globular Amphora culture.

The Maykop culture (3700–3000) emerges somewhat earlier in the northern Caucasus. Although considered by Gimbutas as an outgrowth of the steppe cultures, it is related to the development of Mesopotamia, and Anthony does not consider it to be a Proto-Indo-European culture. The Maykop culture shows the earliest evidence of the beginning Bronze Age, and bronze weapons and artifacts are introduced to the Yamnaya horizon.

Between 3100 and 2600 BCE the Yamnaya people spread into the Danube Valley as far as Hungary. According to Anthony, this migration probably gave rise to Proto-Celtic and Pre-Italic. Pre-Germanic dialects may have developed between the Dniestr (west Ukraine) and the Vistula (Poland) at c. 3100–2800 BCE, and spread with the Corded Ware culture. Slavic and Baltic developed at the middle Dniepr (present-day Ukraine) at c. 2800 BCE, also spreading with the Corded Ware horizon.

Post-Yamnaya
In the northern Don-Volga area the Yamnaya horizon was followed by the Poltavka culture (2700–2100 BCE), while the Corded Ware culture extended eastwards, giving rise to the Sintashta culture (2100–1800). The Sintashta culture extended the Indo-European culture zone east of the Ural mountains, giving rise to Proto-Indo-Iranian and the subsequent spread of the Indo-Iranian languages toward India and the Iranian plateau.

Europe

Decline of Neolithic populations
Between ca. 4000 and 3000 BCE, Neolithic populations in western Europe declined, probably due to the plague and other viral hemorrhagic fevers. This decline was followed by the migrations of Indo-European-speaking populations into western Europe, transforming the genetic make-up of the western populations. Three genetic studies in 2015 concluded that subclades of Y-DNA haplogroups R1b and R1a and an autosomal component present in modern Europeans which was not present in Neolithic Europeans were introduced by Yamnaya-related populations from the West Eurasian Steppe, along with the Indo-European languages.

During the Chalcolithic and early Bronze Age, the cultures of Europe derived from Early European Farmers (EEF) were overwhelmed by successive invasions of Western Steppe Herders (WSHs) from the Pontic–Caspian steppe, who carried about 60% Eastern Hunter-Gatherer (EHG) and 40% Caucasus Hunter-Gatherer (CHG) admixture. These invasions led to EEF paternal DNA lineages in Europe being almost entirely replaced with EHG/WSH paternal DNA (mainly R1b and R1a). EEF maternal DNA (mainly haplogroup N) also heavily declined, being supplanted by steppe lineages, suggesting the migrations involved both males and females from the steppe. The study argues that more than 90% of Britain's Neolithic gene pool was replaced with the coming of the Beaker people, who were around 50% WSH ancestry. Danish archaeologist Kristian Kristiansen  said he is "increasingly convinced there must have been a kind of genocide." According to evolutionary geneticist Eske Willerslev, "There was a heavy reduction of Neolithic DNA in temperate Europe, and a dramatic increase of the new Yamnaya genomic component that was only marginally present in Europe prior to 3000 BC."

Origins of the European IE languages

The origins of Italo-Celtic, Germanic and Balto-Slavic have often been associated with the spread of the Corded Ware horizon and the Bell Beakers, but the specifics remain unsolved. A complicating factor is the association of haplogroup R1b with the Yamnaya horizon and the Bell Beakers, while the Corded Ware horizon is strongly associated with haplogroup R1a. Ancestors of Germanic and Balto-Slavic may have spread with the Corded Ware, originating east of the Carpatians, while the Danube Valley was ancestral to Italo-Celtic.

Relations between the branches
According to David Anthony, pre-Germanic split off earliest (3300 BCE), followed by pre-Italic and pre-Celtic (3000 BCE), pre-Armenian (2800 BCE), pre-Balto-Slavic (2800 BCE) and pre-Greek (2500 BCE).

Mallory notes that the Italic, Celtic and Germanic languages are closely related, which accords with their historic distribution. The Germanic languages are also related to the Baltic and Slavic languages, which in turn share similarities with the Indo-Iranic languages. The Greek, Armenian and Indo-Iranian languages are also related, which suggests "a chain of central Indo-European dialects stretching from the Balkans across the Black sea to the east Caspian". And the Celtic, Italic, Anatolian and Tocharian languages preserve archaisms which are preserved only in those languages.

Although Corded Ware is presumed to be largely derived from the Yamnaya culture, most Corded Ware males carried R1a Y-DNA, while males of the Yamnaya primarily carried R1b-M269. According to Sjögren et al. (2020), R1b-M269 "is the major lineage associated with the arrival of Steppe ancestry in western Europe after 2500 BC[E]," and is strongly related to the Bell Beaker expansion.

The Balkan-Danubian complex and the east-Carpathian contact-zone

The Balkan-Danubian complex is a set of cultures in Southeast Europe, east and west of the Carpathian mountains, from which the western Indo-European languages probably spread into western Europe from c. 3500 BCE. The area east of the Carpathian mountains formed a contact zone between the expanding Yamnaya culture and the northern European farmer cultures. According to Anthony, Pre-Italic and Pre-Celtic (related by Anthony to the Danube valley), and Pre-Germanic and Balto-Slavic (related by Anthony to the east-Carpathian contact zone) may have split off here from Proto-Indo-European.

Anthony (2007) postulates the Usatovo culture as the origin of the pre-Germanic branch. It developed east of the Carpathian mountains, south-eastern Central Europe, at around 3300–3200 BCE at the Dniestr river. Although closely related to the Tripolye culture, it is contemporary with the Yamnaya culture, and resembles it in significant ways. According to Anthony, it may have originated with "steppe clans related to the Yamnaya horizon who were able to impose a patron-client relationship on Tripolye farming villages".

According to Anthony, the Pre-Germanic dialects may have developed in this culture between the Dniestr (west Ukraine) and the Vistula (Poland) at c. 3100–2800 BCE, and spread with the Corded Ware culture. Slavic and Baltic developed at the middle Dniepr (present-day Ukraine) at c. 2800 BCE, spreading north from there.

Anthony (2017) relates the origins of the Corded Ware to the Yamnaya migrations into Hungary. Between 3100 and 2800/2600 BCE, when the Yamnaya horizon spread fast across the Pontic Steppe, a real folk migration of Proto-Indo-European speakers from the Yamna-culture took place into the Danube Valley, moving along Usatovo territory toward specific destinations, reaching as far as Hungary, where as many as 3,000 kurgans may have been raised. According to Anthony (2007), Bell Beaker sites at Budapest, dated c. 2800–2600 BCE, may have aided in spreading Yamnaya dialects into Austria and southern Germany at their west, where Proto-Celtic may have developed. Pre-Italic may have developed in Hungary, and spread toward Italy via the Urnfield culture and Villanovan culture.

According to Parpola, this migration into the Danube Valley is related to the appearance of Indo-European speakers from Europe into Anatolia, and the appearance of Hittite.

The Balkan languages (Thracian, Dacian, Illyrian) may have developed among the early Indo-European populations of southeastern Europe. In the early Middle Ages their territory was occupied by migrating Slavic people, and by east Asian steppe peoples.

Corded Ware culture (3000–2400 BCE)

The Corded Ware culture in Middle Europe (c. 3200 or 2,900–2450 or 2350 cal. BCE) probably played an essential role in the origin and spread of the Indo-European languages in Europe during the Copper and Bronze Ages. David Anthony states that "Childe (1953:133-38) and Gimbutas (1963) speculated that migrants from the steppe Yamnaya horizon (3300–2600 BCE) might have been the creators of the Corded Ware culture and carried IE languages into Europe from the steppes."

While Anthony (2007) situates the development of pre-Germanic dialects east of the Carpathians, arguing for a migration up the Dniestr, Anthony (2017) relates the origins of the Corded Ware to the early third century Yamna-migrations into the Danube-valley, stating that "[t]he migration stream that created these intrusive cemeteries now can be seen to have continued from eastern Hungary across the Carpathians into southern Poland, where the earliest material traits of the Corded ware horizon appeared." In southern Poland, interaction between Scandinavian and Global Amphora resulted in a new culture, absorbed by the incoming Yamnaya pastoralists.

According to Mallory (1999), the Corded Ware culture may be postulated as "the common prehistoric ancestor of the later Celtic, Germanic, Baltic, Slavic, and possibly some of the Indo-European languages of Italy". Yet, Mallory also notes that the Corded Ware can not account for Greek, Illyrian, Thracian and East Italic, which may be derived from Southeast Europe. According to Anthony, the Corded Ware horizon may have introduced Germanic, Baltic and Slavic into northern Europe.

According to Gimbutas, the Corded Ware culture was preceded by the Globular Amphora culture (3400–2800 BCE), which she also regarded to be an Indo-European culture. The Globular Amphora culture stretched from central Europe to the Baltic sea, and emerged from the Funnelbeaker culture. According to Mallory, around 2400 BCE the people of the Corded Ware replaced their predecessors and expanded to Danubian and northern areas of western Germany. A related branch invaded the territories of present-day Denmark and southern Sweden. In places a continuity between Funnelbeaker and Corded Ware can be demonstrated, whereas in other areas Corded Ware heralds a new culture and physical type. According to Cunliffe, most of the expansion was clearly intrusive. Yet, according to Furholt, the Corded Ware culture was an indigenous development, connecting local developments into a larger network.

Recent research by Haak et al. found that four late Corded Ware people (2500–2300 BCE) buried at Esperstadt, Germany, were genetically very close to the Yamna-people, suggesting that a massive migration took place from the Eurasian steppes to Central Europe. According to Haak et al. (2015), German Corded Ware "trace ~75% of their ancestry to the Yamna." In supplementary information to Haak et al. (2015) Anthony, together with Lazaridis, Haak, Patterson, and Reich, notes that the mass migration of Yamnaya people to northern Europe shows that "the languages could have been introduced simply by strength of numbers: via major migration in which both sexes participated."

Volker Heyd has cautioned to be careful with drawing too strong conclusions from those genetic similarities between Corded Ware and Yamna, noting the small number of samples; the late dates of the Esperstadt graves, which could also have undergone Bell Beaker admixture; the presence of Yamna-ancestry in western Europe before the Danube-expansion; and the risks of extrapolating "the results from a handful of individual burials to whole ethnically interpreted populations." Heyd confirms the close connection between Corded Ware and Yamna, but also states that "neither a one-to-one translation from Yamnaya to CWC, nor even the 75:25 ratio as claimed (Haak et al. 2015:211) fits the archaeological record."

Bell Beaker culture (2900–1800 BCE)

The Bell Beaker-culture (c. 2900–1800 BCE) may be ancestral to proto-Celtic, which spread westward from the Alpine regions and formed a "North-west Indo-European" Sprachbund with Italic, Germanic and Balto-Slavic.

The initial moves of the Bell Beakers from the Tagus estuary, Portugal were maritime. A southern move led to the Mediterranean where 'enclaves' were established in southwestern Spain and southern France around the Golfe du Lion and into the Po valley in Italy, probably via ancient western Alpine trade routes used to distribute jadeite axes. A northern move incorporated the southern coast of Armorica. The enclave established in southern Brittany was linked closely to the riverine and landward route, via the Loire, and across the Gâtinais valley to the Seine valley, and thence to the lower Rhine. This was a long-established route reflected in early stone axe distributions and it was via this network that Maritime Bell Beakers first reached the Lower Rhine in about 2600 BCE.

Germanic

The Germanic peoples (also called Teutonic, Suebian or Gothic in older literature) were an Indo-European ethno-linguistic group of Northern European origin, identified by their use of the Germanic languages which diversified out of Proto-Germanic starting during the Pre-Roman Iron Age.

According to Mallory, Germanicists "generally agree" that the Urheimat ('original homeland') of the Proto-Germanic language, the ancestral idiom of all attested Germanic dialects, was primarily situated in an area corresponding to the extent of the Jastorf culture, situated in Denmark and northern Germany.

According to Herrin, the Germanic peoples are believed to have emerged about 1800 BCE with the Nordic Bronze Age (c.1700-500 BCE). The Nordic Bronze Age developed from the absorption of the hunter-gatherer Pitted Ware culture (c.3500-2300 BCE) into the agricultural Battle Axe culture (c. 2800-2300 BCE), which in turn developed from the superimposition of the Corded Ware culture (c. 3100-2350 BCE) upon the Funnelbeaker culture (c. 4300-2800 BCE) on the North European Plain, adjacent to the north of the Bell Beaker culture (c. 2800–2300 BCE). Pre-Germanic may have been related to the Slavo-Baltic and Indo-Iranian languages, but reoriented towards the Italo-Celtic languages.

By the early 1st millennium BC, Proto-Germanic is believed to have been spoken in the areas of present-day Denmark, southern Sweden, southern Norway and Northern Germany. Over time this area was expanded to include and a strip of land on the North European plain stretching from Flanders to the Vistula. Around 28% of the Germanic vocabulary is of non-Indo-European origin.

By the 3rd century BC, the Pre-Roman Iron Age arose among the Germanic peoples, who were at the time expanding southwards at the expense of the Celts and Illyrians. During the subsequent centuries, migrating Germanic peoples reached the banks of the Rhine and the Danube along the Roman border, and also expanded into the territories of Iranian peoples north of the Black Sea.

In the late 4th century, the Huns invaded the Germanic territories from the east, forcing many Germanic tribes to migrate into the Western Roman Empire. During the Viking Age, which began in the 8th century, the North Germanic peoples of Scandinavia migrated throughout Europe, establishing settlements as far as North America. The migrations of the Germanic peoples in the 1st millennium were a formative element in the distribution of peoples in modern Europe.

Italo-Celtic

Italic and Celtic languages are commonly grouped together on the basis of features shared by these two branches and no others. This could imply that they are descended from a common ancestor and/or Proto-Celtic and Proto-Italic developed in close proximity over a long period of time. The Italic languages, like Celtic ones, are split into P and Q forms: P-Italic includes Oscan and Umbrian, while Latin and Faliscan are included in the Q-Italic branch.

The link to the Yamnaya-culture, in the contact zone of western and central Europe between Rhine and Vistula (Poland), is as follows: Yamnaya culture (c. 3300–2600 BC) – Corded Ware culture (c. 3100–2350 BCE) – Bell Beaker culture (c. 2800–1800 BC) – Unetice culture (c. 2300–1680 BCE) – Tumulus culture (c. 1600–1200 BCE) – Urnfield culture (c. 1300–750 BCE). At the Balkan, the Vučedol culture (c.3000–2200 BCE) formed a contact zone between post-Yamnaya and Bell Beaker culture.

Italic

The Italic languages are a subfamily of the Indo-European language family originally spoken by Italic peoples. They include the Romance languages derived from Latin (Italian, Sardinian, Spanish, Catalan, Portuguese, French, Romanian, Occitan, etc.); a number of extinct languages of the Italian Peninsula, including Umbrian, Oscan, Faliscan, South Picene; and Latin itself. At present, Latin and its daughter Romance languages are the only surviving languages of the Italic language family.

The most widely accepted theory suggests that Latins and other proto-Italic tribes first entered in Italy with the late Bronze Age Proto-Villanovan culture (12th–10th cent. BCE), then part of the central European Urnfield culture system (1300-750 BCE). In particular various authors, like Marija Gimbutas, had noted important similarities between Proto-Villanova, the South-German Urnfield culture of Bavaria-Upper Austria and Middle-Danube Urnfield culture. According to David W. Anthony, proto-Latins originated in today's eastern Hungary, kurganized around 3100 BCE by the Yamnaya culture, while Kristian Kristiansen associated the Proto-Villanovans with the Velatice-Baierdorf culture of Moravia and Austria.

Today the Romance languages, which comprise all languages that descended from Latin, are spoken by more than 800 million native speakers worldwide, mainly in the Americas, Europe, and Africa. Romance languages are either official, co-official, or significantly used in 72 countries around the globe.

Celtic

The Celts (occasionally , see pronunciation of Celtic) or Kelts were an ethnolinguistic group of tribal societies in Iron Age and Medieval Europe who spoke Celtic languages and had a similar culture, although the relationship between the ethnic, linguistic and cultural elements remains uncertain and controversial.

The earliest archaeological culture that may justifiably be considered Proto-Celtic is the Late Bronze Age Urnfield culture of Central Europe, which flourished from around 1200 BCE.

Their fully Celtic descendants in central Europe were the people of the Iron Age Hallstatt culture (c. 800–450 BCE) named for the rich grave finds in Hallstatt, Austria. By the later La Tène period (c. 450 BCE up to the Roman conquest), this Celtic culture had expanded by diffusion or migration to the British Isles (Insular Celts), France and The Low Countries (Gauls), Bohemia, Poland and much of Central Europe, the Iberian Peninsula (Celtiberians, Celtici and Gallaeci) and Italy (Golaseccans, Lepontii, Ligures and Cisalpine Gauls) and, following the Gallic invasion of the Balkans in 279 BCE, as far east as central Anatolia (Galatians).

The Celtic languages (usually pronounced  but sometimes ) are descended from Proto-Celtic, or "Common Celtic"; a branch of the greater Indo-European language family. The term "Celtic" was first used to describe this language group by Edward Lhuyd in 1707.

Modern Celtic languages are mostly spoken on the northwestern edge of Europe, notably in Ireland, Scotland, Wales, Brittany, Cornwall, and the Isle of Man, and can be found spoken on Cape Breton Island. There are also a substantial number of Welsh speakers in the Patagonia area of Argentina. Some people speak Celtic languages in the other Celtic diaspora areas of the United States, Canada, Australia, and New Zealand. In all these areas, the Celtic languages are now only spoken by minorities though there are continuing efforts at revitalization. Welsh is the only Celtic language not classified as "endangered" by UNESCO.

During the 1st millennium BCE, they were spoken across much of Europe, in the Iberian Peninsula, from the Atlantic and North Sea coastlines, up to the Rhine valley and down the Danube valley to the Black Sea, the northern Balkan Peninsula and in central Asia Minor. The spread to Cape Breton and Patagonia occurred in modern times. Celtic languages, particularly Irish, were spoken in Australia before federation in 1901 and are still used there to some extent.

Balto-Slavic

The Balto-Slavic language group traditionally comprises the Baltic and Slavic languages, belonging to the Indo-European family of languages. Baltic and Slavic languages share several linguistic traits not found in any other Indo-European branch, which points to a period of common development. Most Indo-Europeanists classify Baltic and Slavic languages into a single branch, even though some details of the nature of their relationship remain in dispute in some circles, usually due to political controversies. As an alternative to the model of a binary split into Slavic and Baltic, some linguists suggest that Balto-Slavic should be split into three equidistant nodes: Eastern Baltic, Western Baltic and Slavic.

A Proto-Balto-Slavic language is reconstructable by the comparative method, descending from Proto-Indo-European by means of well-defined sound laws, and out of which modern Slavic and Baltic languages descended. One particularly innovative dialect separated from the Balto-Slavic dialect continuum and became ancestral to the Proto-Slavic language, from which all Slavic languages descended. Some linguists, however, reject the Balto-Slavic theory, believing that Baltic and Slavic languages evolved independently from Proto-Baltic and Proto-Slavic respectively.

Balts

The Balts or Baltic peoples are an Indo-European ethno-linguistic group who speak the Baltic languages, a branch of the Indo-European language family, which was originally spoken by tribes living in the area east of the Jutland peninsula in the west and west of Moscow and the Oka and Volga rivers basins in the east. One of the features of Baltic languages is the number of conservative or archaic features retained. Among the Baltic peoples are modern Lithuanians, Latvians (including Latgalians) – all Eastern Balts – as well as the Old Prussians, Yotvingians and Galindians – the Western Balts – whose people also survived, but their languages and cultures are now extinct, and are now being assimilated into the Eastern Baltic community.

Slavs

The Slavs are an Indo-European ethno-linguistic group living in Central Europe, Eastern Europe, Southeast Europe, North Asia and Central Asia, who speak the Indo-European Slavic languages, and share, to varying degrees, certain cultural traits and historical backgrounds. From the early 6th century they spread to inhabit most of Central and Eastern Europe and Southeast Europe. Slavic groups also ventured as far as Scandinavia, constituting elements amongst the Vikings; whilst at the other geographic extreme, Slavic mercenaries fighting for the Byzantines and Arabs settled Asia Minor and even as far as Syria. Later, East Slavs (specifically, Russians and Ukrainians) colonized Siberia and Central Asia. Every Slavic ethnicity has emigrated to other parts of the world. Over half of Europe's territory is inhabited by Slavic-speaking communities.

Modern nations and ethnic groups called by the ethnonym Slavs are considerably diverse both genetically and culturally, and relations between them – even within the individual ethnic groups themselves – are varied, ranging from a sense of connection to mutual feelings of hostility.

Present-day Slavic people are classified into East Slavic (chiefly Belarusians, Russians and Ukrainians), West Slavic (chiefly Poles, Czechs, Slovaks, Wends and Sorbs), and South Slavic (chiefly Bosniaks, Bulgarians, Croats, Goranis, Macedonians, Montenegrins, Serbs and Slovenes). For a more comprehensive list, see the ethnocultural subdivisions.

Balkan languages

Thracian and Dacian

Thracian

The Thracian language was the Indo-European language spoken in Southeast Europe by the Thracians, the northern neighbors of the Greeks. Some authors group Thracian and Dacian into a southern Baltic linguistic family.
The Thracians inhabited a large area in southeastern Europe, including parts of the ancient provinces of Thrace, Moesia, Macedonia, Dacia, Scythia Minor, Sarmatia, Bithynia, Mysia, Pannonia, and other regions of the Balkans and Anatolia. This area extended over most of the Balkans region, and the Getae north of the Danube as far as beyond the Bug and including Panonia in the west.

The origins of the Thracians remain obscure, in the absence of written historical records. Evidence of proto-Thracians in the prehistoric period depends on artifacts of material culture. Leo Klejn identifies proto-Thracians with the multi-cordoned ware culture that was pushed away from Ukraine by the advancing timber grave culture. It is generally proposed that a proto-Thracian people developed from a mixture of indigenous peoples and Indo-Europeans from the time of Proto-Indo-European expansion in the Early Bronze Age when the latter, around 1500 BCE, mixed with indigenous peoples. We speak of proto-Thracians from which during the Iron Age (about 1000 BCE) Dacians and Thracians begin developing.

Dacian

The Dacians were an Indo-European people, part of or related to the Thracians. Dacians were the ancient inhabitants of Dacia, located in the area in and around the Carpathian Mountains and west of the Black Sea. This area includes the present-day countries of Romania and Moldova, as well as parts of Ukraine, Eastern Serbia, Northern Bulgaria, Slovakia, Hungary and Southern Poland.

The Dacians spoke the Dacian language, believed to have been closely related to Thracian, but were somewhat culturally influenced by the neighbouring Scythians and by the Celtic invaders of the 4th century BCE. The Dacians and Getae were always considered as Thracians by the ancients (Dio Cassius, Trogus Pompeius, Appian, Strabo and Pliny the Elder), and were both said to speak the same Thracian language.

Evidence of proto-Thracians or proto-Dacians in the prehistoric period depends on the remains of material culture. It is generally proposed that a proto-Dacian or proto-Thracian people developed from a mixture of indigenous peoples and Indo-Europeans from the time of Proto-Indo-European expansion in the Early Bronze Age (3,300–3,000 BCE) when the latter, around 1500 BCE, conquered the indigenous peoples. The indigenous people were Danubian farmers, and the invading people of the 3rd millennium BCE were Kurgan warrior-herders from the Ukrainian and Russian steppes.

Indo-Europeanization was complete by the beginning of the Bronze Age. The people of that time are best described as proto-Thracians, which later developed in the Iron Age into Danubian-Carpathian Geto-Dacians as well as Thracians of the eastern Balkan Peninsula.

Illyrian

The Illyrians (Illyrioi;  or Illyri) were a group of Indo-European tribes in antiquity, who inhabited part of the western Balkans and the southeastern coasts of the Italian peninsula (Messapia). The territory the Illyrians inhabited came to be known as Illyria to Greek and Roman authors, who identified a territory that corresponds to the Croatia, Bosnia and Herzegovina, Slovenia, Montenegro, part of Serbia and most of Albania, between the Adriatic Sea in the west, the Drava river in the north, the Morava river in the east and the mouth of the Aoos river in the south. The first account of Illyrian peoples comes from the Periplus of Pseudo-Scylax, an ancient Greek text of the middle of the 4th century BCE that describes coastal passages in the Mediterranean.

These tribes, or at least a number of tribes considered "Illyrians proper", of which only small fragments are attested enough to classify as branches of Indo-European; were probably extinct by the 2nd century CE.

The name "Illyrians", as applied by the ancient Greeks to their northern neighbors, may have referred to a broad, ill-defined group of peoples, and it is today unclear to what extent they were linguistically and culturally homogeneous. The Illyrian tribes never collectively regarded themselves as 'Illyrians', and it is unlikely that they used any collective nomenclature for themselves. The name Illyrians seems to be the name applied to a specific Illyrian tribe, which was the first to come in contact with the ancient Greeks during the Bronze Age, causing the name Illyrians to be applied to all people of similar language and customs.

Albanian

Centuries-old communities speaking Albanian-based dialects can be found scattered in Greece, southern Italy, Sicily, and Ukraine. As a result of a modern diaspora, there are also Albanian speakers elsewhere in those countries and in other parts of the world, including Scandinavia, Switzerland, Germany, Austria and Hungary, United Kingdom, Turkey, Australia, New Zealand, Netherlands, Singapore, Brazil, Canada, and the United States.

The earliest written document that mentions the Albanian language is a late 13th-century crime report from Dubrovnik. The first audio recording of the Albanian language was made by Norbert Jokl on 4 April 1914 in Vienna.

Armenian, Greek and Phrygian

Armenian

The Armenian language was first put into writing in 406 or 407AD when a priest known as Mesrop developed an Armenian alphabet.

There are three views amongst scholars about how speakers of Armenian came to be in what is now Armenia. One is that they came with Phrygians from the west, or with the Mitanni from the east, and took over from the non-Indo-European speaking Urartians, who were previously dominant in this area. Another view is that the Armenian people came to speak an Indo-European language after originally speaking a Caucasian language. The third view is that the ancestor of the Armenian language was already spoken in the area during the time when it was politically dominated first by the Hittites, and later by the Urartians.

A minority view also suggests that the Indo-European homeland may have been located in the Armenian Highland.

Hellenic Greek

Hellenic is the branch of the Indo-European language family that includes the different varieties of Greek. In traditional classifications, Hellenic consists of Greek alone, but some linguists group Greek together with various ancient languages thought to have been closely related or distinguish varieties of Greek that are distinct enough to be considered separate languages.

The Proto-Greeks, who spoke the predecessor of the Mycenaean language, are mostly placed in the Early Helladic period in Greece (early 3rd millennium BCE; circa 3200 BCE) towards the end of the Neolithic in Southern Europe. In the late Neolithic, speakers of this dialect, which would become Proto-Greek, migrated from their homeland northeast of the Black Sea to the Balkans and into the Greek peninsula. The evolution of Proto-Greek could be considered within the context of an early Paleo-Balkan sprachbund that makes it difficult to delineate exact boundaries between individual languages. The characteristically Greek representation of word-initial laryngeals by prothetic vowels is shared, for one, by the Armenian language, which also seems to share some other phonological and morphological peculiarities of Greek; this has led some linguists to propose a hypothetically closer relationship between Greek and Armenian, although evidence remains scant.

Phrygian 

The Phrygians (gr. Φρύγες, Phrúges or Phrýges) were an ancient Indo-European people, who established their kingdom with a capital eventually at Gordium. It is presently unknown whether the Phrygians were actively involved in the collapse of the Hittite capital Hattusa or whether they simply moved into the vacuum left by the collapse of Hittite hegemony after the Late Bronze Age collapse.

The Phrygian language  was the language spoken by the Phrygians in Asia Minor during Classical Antiquity (ca. 8th century BCE to 5th century CE). Phrygian is considered by some linguists to have been closely related to Greek. The similarity of some Phrygian words to Greek ones was observed by Plato in his Cratylus (410a). However, Eric P. Hamp suggests that Phrygian was related to Italo-Celtic in a hypothetical "Northwest Indo-European" group.

According to Herodotus, the Phrygians were initially dwelling in the southern Balkans under the name of Bryges (Briges), changing it to Phruges after their final migration to Anatolia, via the Hellespont. Though the migration theory is still defended by many modern historians, most archaeologists have abandoned the migration hypothesis regarding the origin of the Phrygians due to a lack substantial archaeological evidence, with the migration theory resting only on the accounts of Herodotus and Xanthus.

From tribal and village beginnings, the state of Phrygia arose in the eighth century BCE with its capital at Gordium. During this period, the Phrygians extended eastward and encroached upon the kingdom of Urartu, the descendants of the Hurrians, a former rival of the Hittites. Meanwhile, the Phrygian Kingdom was overwhelmed by Cimmerian invaders around 690 BCE, then briefly conquered by its neighbour Lydia, before it passed successively into the Persian Empire of Cyrus the Great and the empire of Alexander and his successors, was taken by the Attalids of Pergamon, and eventually became part of the Roman Empire. The last mention of the Phrygian language in literature dates to the fifth century CE and it was likely extinct by the seventh century.

Indo-Iranian migrations

Indo-Iranian peoples are a grouping of ethnic groups consisting of the Indo-Aryan, Iranian, Dardic and Nuristani peoples; that is, speakers of Indo-Iranian languages, a major branch of the Indo-European language family.

The Proto-Indo-Iranians are commonly identified with the Sintashta culture and the subsequent Andronovo culture within the broader Andronovo horizon, and their homeland with an area of the Eurasian steppe that borders the Ural River on the west, the Tian Shan on the east.

The Indo-Iranians interacted with the Bactria-Margiana Culture, also called "Bactria–Margiana Archaeological Complex". Proto-Indo-Iranian arose due to this influence. The Indo-Iranians also borrowed their distinctive religious beliefs and practices from this culture.

The Indo-Iranian migrations took place in two waves. The first wave consisted of the Indo-Aryan migration into the Levant and a migration south-eastward of the Vedic people, over the Hindu Kush into northern India. The Indo-Aryans split-off around 1800–1600 BCE from the Iranians, where-after they were defeated and split into two groups by the Iranians, who dominated the Central Eurasian steppe zone and "chased [the Indo-Aryans] to the extremities of Central Eurasia". Supposedly one group were the Indo-Aryans who founded the Mitanni kingdom around northern Syria; (c. 1500–1300 BCE) the other group were the Vedic people. Christopher I. Beckwith suggests that the Wusun, an Indo-European Caucasian people of Inner Asia in antiquity, were also of Indo-Aryan origin.

The second wave is interpreted as the Iranian wave, and took place in the third stage of the Indo-European migrations from 800 BCE onwards.

Sintashta-Petrovka and Andronovo culture

Sintashta-Petrovka culture

The Sintashta culture, also known as the Sintashta-Petrovka culture or Sintashta-Arkaim culture, is a Bronze Age archaeological culture of the northern Eurasian steppe on the borders of Eastern Europe and Central Asia, dated to the period 2100–1800 BCE. It is probably the archaeological manifestation of the Indo-Iranian language group.

The Sintashta culture emerged from the interaction of two antecedent cultures. Its immediate predecessor in the Ural-Tobol steppe was the Poltavka culture, an offshoot of the cattle-herding Yamnaya horizon that moved east into the region between 2800 and 2600 BCE. Several Sintashta towns were built over older Poltavka settlements or close to Poltavka cemeteries, and Poltavka motifs are common on Sintashta pottery. Sintashta material culture also shows the influence of the late Abashevo culture, a collection of Corded Ware settlements in the forest steppe zone north of the Sintashta region that were also predominantly pastoralist. Allentoft et al. (2015) also found close autosomal genetic relationship between peoples of Corded Ware culture and Sintashta culture.

The earliest known chariots have been found in Sintashta burials, and the culture is considered a strong candidate for the origin of the technology, which spread throughout the Old World and played an important role in ancient warfare. Sintashta settlements are also remarkable for the intensity of copper mining and bronze metallurgy carried out there, which is unusual for a steppe culture.

Because of the difficulty of identifying the remains of Sintashta sites beneath those of later settlements, the culture was only recently distinguished from the Andronovo culture. It is now recognised as a separate entity forming part of the 'Andronovo horizon'.

Andronovo culture

The Andronovo culture is a collection of similar local Bronze Age Indo-Iranian cultures that flourished c. 1800–900 BCE in western Siberia and the west Asiatic steppe. It is probably better termed an archaeological complex or archaeological horizon. The name derives from the village of Andronovo, where in 1914, several graves were discovered, with skeletons in crouched positions, buried with richly decorated pottery. The older Sintashta culture (2100–1800), formerly included within the Andronovo culture, is now considered separately, but regarded as its predecessor, and accepted as part of the wider Andronovo horizon. At least four sub-cultures of the Andronovo horizon have been distinguished, during which the culture expands towards the south and the east:
Sintashta-Petrovka-Arkaim (Southern Urals, northern Kazakhstan, 2200–1600 BCE)
the Sintashta fortification of ca. 1800 BCE in Chelyabinsk Oblast
 the Petrovka settlement fortified settlement in Kazakhstan
the nearby Arkaim settlement dated to the 17th century
Alakul (1800–1400 BCE) between Oxus and Jaxartes, Kyzylkum desert
Alekseyevka (1300–1100 BCE "final Bronze") in eastern Kazakhstan, contacts with Namazga VI in Turkmenia
 Ingala Valley in the south of the Tyumen Oblast
Fedorovo (1900–1400 BCE) in southern Siberia (earliest evidence of cremation and fire cult)
Beshkent–Vakhsh (1000–800 BCE)

The geographical extent of the culture is vast and difficult to delineate exactly. On its western fringes, it overlaps with the approximately contemporaneous, but distinct, Srubna culture in the Volga-Ural interfluvial. To the east, it reaches into the Minusinsk depression, with some sites as far west as the southern Ural Mountains, overlapping with the area of the earlier Afanasevo culture. Additional sites are scattered as far south as the Koppet Dag (Turkmenistan), the Pamir (Tajikistan) and the Tian Shan (Kyrgyzstan). The northern boundary vaguely corresponds to the beginning of the Taiga. In the Volga basin, interaction with the Srubna culture was the most intense and prolonged, and Federovo style pottery is found as far west as Volgograd.

Most researchers associate the Andronovo horizon with early Indo-Iranian languages, though it may have overlapped the early Uralic-speaking area at its northern fringe. According to Narasimhan et al. (2018), the expansion of the Andronovo culture towards the BMAC took place via the Inner Asia Mountain Corridor.

Bactria-Margiana Culture

The Bactria-Margiana Culture, also called "Bactria-Margiana Archaeological Complex" (BMAC), was a non-Indo-European culture which influenced the Indo-European groups of the second stage of the Indo-European migrations. It was centered in what is nowadays northwestern Afghanistan and southern Turkmenistan, and had an elaborate trade-network reachings as far as the Indus civilisation, the Iranian plateau, and the Persian Gulf. Finds within BMAC sites include an Elamite-type cylinder seal and a Harappan seal stamped with an elephant and Indus script found at Gonur-depe.

Proto-Indo-Iranian arose due to this BMAC-influence. The Indo-Iranians also borrowed their distinctive religious beliefs and practices from this culture. According to Anthony, the Old Indic religion probably emerged among Indo-European immigrants in the contact zone between the Zeravshan River (present-day Uzbekistan) and (present-day) Iran. It was "a syncretic mixture of old Central Asian and new Indo-European elements", which borrowed "distinctive religious beliefs and practices" from the Bactria–Margiana culture. At least 383 non-Indo-European words were borrowed from this culture, including the god Indra and the ritual drink Soma.

Indo-Aryan migrations

Syria: Mitanni

Mitanni (Hittite cuneiform ), also Mittani or Hanigalbat (Assyrian Hanigalbat, Khanigalbat cuneiform ) or Naharin in ancient Egyptian texts was a Hurrian (non-Indo-European)-speaking state in northern Syria and south-east Anatolia from c. 1500–1300 BCE. Mitanni came to be a regional power after the Hittite destruction of Amorite Babylon and a series of ineffectual Assyrian kings created a power vacuum in Mesopotamia. The capital of Mittanni was Washukanni, whose location has been determined by archaeologists to be on the headwaters of the Khabur River.

Although the Hurrian language is non-Indo-European, yet there are certain names and words found in the texts which suggest an Indo-Aryan influence. Among these are the names of gods (Indra, Mitra, Varuna, and Agni) and some personal names. There are also certain Indo-Aryan technical terms in a horse-training manual by a certain Kikkuli, dated to about 1400 BC. Several Mitanni rulers, such as Shattiwaza, had names which could be interpreted as Indo-Aryan. One explanation for this is that a militarily powerful, nomadic Indo-Aryan elite settled in Mitanni, and came to politically dominate the indigenous population.

India: Indo-Aryans

The research on the Indo-Aryan migrations began with the study of the Rig Veda in the mid-19th century by Max Muller, and gradually evolved from a theory of a large scale invasion of a racially and technologically superior people to being a slow diffusion of small numbers of nomadic people that had a disproportionate societal impact on a large urban population. Contemporary claims of Indo-Aryan migrations are drawn from linguistic, archaeological, literary and cultural sources.

The Indo-Aryan migrations involved a number of tribes, who may have infiltrated northern India in series of "waves" of migration. Archaeological cultures identified with phases of Indo-Aryan culture include the Ochre Coloured Pottery culture, the Gandhara Grave culture, the Black and red ware culture and the Painted Grey Ware culture.

Parpola postulates a first wave of immigration from as early as 1900 BCE, corresponding to the Cemetery H culture and the Copper Hoard culture, c.q. Ochre Coloured Pottery culture, and an immigration to the Punjab ca. 1700–1400 BCE. According to Kochhar there were three waves of Indo-Aryan immigration that occurred after the mature Harappan phase:
 the "Murghamu" (Bactria-Margiana culture) related people who entered Balochistan at Pirak, Mehrgarh south cemetery, and other places, and later merged with the post-urban Harappans during the late Harappans Jhukar phase (2000–1800 BCE);
 the Swat IV that co-founded the Harappan Cemetery H phase in Punjab (2000–1800 BCE);
 and the Rigvedic Indo-Aryans of Swat V that later absorbed the Cemetery H people and gave rise to the Painted Grey Ware culture (PGW) (to 1400 BCE).

The Vedic Indo-Aryans started to migrate into northwestern India around 1500 BCE, as a slow diffusion during the Late Harappan period, establishing the Vedic religion during the Vedic period (c. 1500–500 BCE). The associated culture was initially a tribal, pastoral society centred in the northwestern parts of the Indian subcontinent; it spread after 1200 BCE to the Ganges Plain, as it was shaped by increasing settled agriculture, a hierarchy of four social classes, and the emergence of monarchical, state-level polities.

The end of the Vedic period witnessed the rise of large, urbanized states as well as of shramana movements (including Jainism and Buddhism) which opposed and challenged the expanding Vedic orthodoxy. Around the beginning of the Common Era, the Vedic tradition formed one of the main constituents of the so-called "Hindu synthesis"

Inner Asia: Wusun

According to Christopher I. Beckwith the Wusun, an Indo-European Caucasian people of Inner Asia in antiquity, were also of Indo-Aryan origin. From the Chinese term Wusun, Beckwith reconstructs the Old Chinese *âswin, which he compares to the Old Indo-Aryan aśvin "the horsemen", the name of the Rigvedic twin equestrian gods. Beckwith suggests that the Wusun were an eastern remnant of the Indo-Aryans, who had been suddenly pushed to the extremities of the Eurasian Steppe by the Iranian peoples in the 2nd millennium BCE.

The Wusun are first mentioned by Chinese sources as vassals in the Tarim Basin of the Yuezhi, another Indo-European Caucasian people of possible Tocharian stock. Around 175 BCE, the Yuezhi were utterly defeated by the Xiongnu, also former vassals of the Yuezhi. The Yuezhi subsequently attacked the Wusun and killed their king (Kunmo  or Kunmi ) Nandoumi, capturing the Ili Valley from the Saka (Scythians) shortly afterwards. In return the Wusun settled in the former territories of the Yuezhi as vassals of the Xiongnu.

The son of Nandoumi was adopted by the Xiongnu king and made leader of the Wusun. Around 130 BCE he attacked and utterly defeated the Yuezhi, settling the Wusun in the Ili Valley.

After the Yuezhi were defeated by the Xiongnu, in the 2nd century BCE, a small group, known as the Little Yuezhi, fled to the south, while the majority migrated west to the Ili Valley, where they displaced the Sakas (Scythians). Driven from the Ili Valley shortly afterwards by the Wusun, the Yuezhi migrated to Sogdia and then Bactria, where they are often identified with the Tokhárioi (Τοχάριοι) and Asioi of Classical sources. They then expanded into northern South Asia, where one branch of the Yuezhi founded the Kushan Empire. The Kushan empire stretched from Turfan in the Tarim Basin to Pataliputra on the Gangetic plain at its greatest extent, and played an important role in the development of the Silk Road and the transmission of Buddhism to China.

Soon after 130 BCE the Wusun became independent of the Xiongnu, becoming trusted vassals of the Han Dynasty and powerful force in the region for centuries. With the emerging steppe federations of the Rouran, the Wusun migrated into the Pamir Mountains in the 5th century CE. They are last mentioned in 938 when a Wusun chieftain paid tribute to the Liao dynasty.

Mesopotamia – Kassites
The Kassite language was not Indo-European. However, the appearance of the Kassites in Mesopotamia in the 18th century BCE has been connected to the contemporary Indo-European expansion into the region at the time.

The Kassites gained control of Babylonia after the Hittite sack of the city in 1595 BCE (i.e. 1531 BCE per the short chronology), and established a dynasty based in Dur-Kurigalzu. The Kassites were members of a small military aristocracy but were efficient rulers and not locally unpopular. The horse, which the Kassites worshipped, first came into use in Babylonia at this time. The Kassites were polytheistic, and the name of some 30 gods are known.

The Kassite language has not been classified. Genetic relations of the Kassite language are unclear, although it is generally agreed that it was not Semitic; relation with Elamite is doubtful. Relationship with or membership in the Hurro-Urartian family has been suggested, being possibly related to it, based on a number of words. However, several Kassite leaders bore Indo-European names, and the Kassites worshipped several Indo-Aryan gods, suggesting that the Kassites were under significant Indo-European influence. The reign of the Kassites laid the essential groundwork for the development of subsequent Babylonian culture.

Iranians

Iranian plateau

The Iranian peoples (also known as Iranic peoples) are an Indo-European ethno-linguistic group that comprise the speakers of Iranian languages. Their historical areas of settlement were on the Iranian plateau (mainly Iran, Azerbaijan and Afghanistan) and certain neighbouring areas of Asia (such as parts of the Caucasus, Eastern Turkey, Northeast Syria, Uzbekistan, Tajikistan, Bahrain, Oman, northern Iraq, Northwestern and Western Pakistan) reflecting changing geopolitical range of the Persian empires and the Iranian history.

The Medes, Parthians and Persians begin to appear on the western Iranian plateau from c. 800 BCE, after which they remained under Assyrian rule for several centuries, as it was with the rest of the peoples in the Near East. The Achaemenids replaced Median rule from 559 BCE. Around the first millennium CE, the Kambojas, the Pashtuns and the Baloch began to settle on the eastern edge of the Iranian plateau, on the mountainous frontier of northwestern and western Pakistan, displacing the earlier Indo-Aryans from the area.

Their current distribution spreads across the Iranian plateau, and stretches from the Caucasus in the north to the Persian Gulf in the south, and from the Indus River in the east to eastern Turkey in the west – a region that is sometimes called the "Iranian cultural continent", or Greater Iran by some scholars, and represents the extent of the Iranian languages and significant influence of the Iranian peoples, through the geopolitical reach of the Iranian empire.

The Iranians comprise the present day Persians, Lurs, Ossetians, Kurds, Pashtuns, Balochs, Tajiks and their sub-groups of the historic Medes, Massagetaes, Sarmatians, Scythians, Parthians, Alans, Bactrians, Soghdians and other people of Central Asia, the Caucasus and the Iranian plateau. Another possible group are the Cimmerians who are mostly supposed to have been related to either Iranian or Thracian speaking groups, or at least to have been ruled by an Iranian elite.

Scythians

The first Iranians to reach the Black Sea may have been the Cimmerians in the 8th century BCE, although their linguistic affiliation is uncertain. They were followed by the Scythians, who would dominate the area, at their height, from the Carpathian Mountains in the west, to the easternmost fringes of Central Asia in the east, including the Indo-Scythian Kingdom in India. For most of their existence, they were based in what is modern-day Ukraine and southern European Russia.

Sarmatian tribes, of whom the best known are the Roxolani (Rhoxolani), Iazyges (Jazyges) and the Alani (Alans), followed the Scythians westwards into Europe in the late centuries BCE and the 1st and 2nd centuries of the Common Era (The Age of Migrations). The populous Sarmatian tribe of the Massagetae, dwelling near the Caspian Sea, were known to the early rulers of Persia in the Achaemenid Period. In the east, the Saka occupied several areas in Xinjiang, from Khotan to Tumshuq.

Decline in central Asia
In Central Asia, the Turkic languages have marginalized Iranian languages as a result of the Turkic expansion of the early centuries CE. In Eastern Europe, Slavic and Germanic peoples assimilated and absorbed the native Iranian languages (Scythian and Sarmatian) of the region. Extant major Iranian languages are Persian, Pashto, Kurdish, and Balochi, besides numerous smaller ones.

Alternative hypotheses

Paleolithic Continuity Paradigm

The "Paleolithic Continuity Paradigm" is a hypothesis suggesting that the Proto-Indo-European language (PIE) can be traced back to the Upper Paleolithic, several millennia earlier than the Chalcolithic or at the most Neolithic estimates in other scenarios of Proto-Indo-European origins. Its main proponents are Marcel Otte, Alexander Häusler, and Mario Alinei.

The PCT posits that the advent of Indo-European languages should be linked to the arrival of Homo sapiens in Europe and Asia from Africa in the Upper Paleolithic. Employing "lexical periodization", Alinei arrives at a timeline deeper than even that of Colin Renfrew's Anatolian hypothesis.

Since 2004, an informal workgroup of scholars who support the Paleolithic Continuity hypothesis has been held online. Apart from Alinei himself, its leading members (referred to as "Scientific Committee" in the website) are linguists Xaverio Ballester (University of Valencia) and Francesco Benozzo (University of Bologna). Also included are prehistorian Marcel Otte (Université de Liège) and anthropologist Henry Harpending (University of Utah).

It is not listed by Mallory among the proposals for the origins of the Indo-European languages that are widely discussed and considered credible within academia.

Indian origins

The notion of "indigenous Aryans" posits that speakers of Indo-Aryan languages are "indigenous" to the Indian subcontinent. Scholars like Jim G. Shaffer and B. B. Lal note the absence of archaeological remains of an Aryan "conquest", and the high degree of physical continuity between Harappan and Post-Harappan society. They support the controversial hypothesis that the Indo-Aryan civilization was not introduced by Aryan migrations, but originated in pre-Vedic India.

In recent years, the concept of "indigenous Aryans" has been increasingly conflated with an "Out of India" origin of the Indo-European language family. This contrasts with the model of Indo-Aryan migration which posits that Indo-Aryan tribes migrated to India from Central Asia. Some furthermore claim that all Indo-European languages originated in India. Support for the Out of India theory IAT mostly exists among a subset of Indian scholars, playing a significant role in Hindutva politics, but has no relevance, let alone support, in mainstream scholarship.

See also
 Proto-Indo-Europeans
 Western Steppe Herders
 Haplogroup R1a
 Haplogroup R1b
 Genetic history of Europe
 Pre-modern human migration

Notes

Subnotes

References

Sources
Printed sources

 
 
 
 
 
 

 
 

 
 
 
 
 
 
 

 
 
 

 
 
 
 

 
 
 

 

 
 
 

 
 Grigoriev, Stanislav (2002). "Ancient Indo-Europeans". Chelyabinsk. Rifei.
 

 
 
 
 
 
 
 
 
 

 

 
 

 Kassian, Alexei S., Mikhail Zhivlov, George Starostin, Artem A. Trofimov, Petr A. Kocharov, Anna Kuritsyna and Mikhail N. Saenko (2021). "Rapid radiation of the inner Indo-European languages: an advanced approach to Indo-European lexicostatistics". Linguistics, Volume 59 Issue 4.
 
 
 
 
 
 
 
 
 
 
 
 
 

 
 
 
 

 
 
 
 
 
 
 
 
 
 

 
 
 
 
 
 

 
 
 
 
 
 
 
 
 
 

 
 

 
 
 

 
 
 
 
 
 
 

 
 
 

 
 

 

 
 
 
 
 
 
 
 
 

 

 

Web-sources

Further reading
Books
Overview
 
 
 
 
Indo-Iranians
Vasil’ev, I. B., P. F. Kuznetsov, and A. P. Semenova. "Potapovo Burial Ground of the Indo-Iranic Tribes on the Volga" (1994).
 
 
Greeks
 
 
 
 

Genetics (R1a)
 

Genetics (Europe)
 
 
 
 
 Kristiansen (2017), Re-theorising mobility and the formation of culture and language among the Corded Ware Culture in Europe

Genetics (India)
 
 
 
 
 
 Damgaard et al. (2018), The first horse herders and the impact of early Bronze Age steppe expansions into Asia, including linguistic and archaeological supplements
 

Genetecis and archaeology
 

Genetics and language
 

Linguistics and archaeology

External links

Overview of steppe-theory
 Formation of the Indo-European Branches in the light of the Archaeogenetic Revolution, John Koch (2018)
 The Ukrainian Week, The Cradle of Indo-Europeans. The dawn of Indo-Europeans on the Ukrainian steppes
 Proto-Indo-European homelands – ancient genetic clues at last?, Edward Pegler, Armchair Prehistory (blog)
 The Indo-European homeland problem – part 1, Mikkel Nørtoft

Genetics
 DNAeXplained – Genetic Genealogy, Yamnaya, Light Skinned, Brown Eyed….Ancestors???
 The Genomic Ancient DNA Revolution – Interview with David Reich
 Tony Joseph (2017), How genetics is settling the Aryan migration debate, The Hindu
 Tony Joseph (2018), How We, The Indians, Came to Be summary of Narasimhan (2018)
 Rohan Venkataramakrishnan (2018), Aryan migration: Everything you need to know about the new study on Indian genetics, Scroll.In (summary of Narasimhan (2018)

Linguistics
 ScienceDaily, New Insights into Origins of World's Languages
 Encyclopædia Britannica, Indo-European languages

Genetics and archaeology
 Ewen Callaway (2018), Divided by DNA: The uneasy relationship between archaeology and ancient genomics, Science

Alternative theories
 Indo-European.info and indo-european.eu (Carlos Quiles), relates the Corded Ware culture to a Uralic language
 Mario Alinei (2012), The Paleolithic Continuity Paradigm for the Origins of Indo-European Languages

Maps
 Maps of Indo-European migrations (series of maps, from Paleolithic migrations to Medieval migrations)

Animated maps
 Homeland time map, University of Copenhagen
 The Spread of the Indo-Europeans

Research centers
 The Homeland, University of Copenhagen

1st millennium BC
2nd millennium BC
3rd millennium BC
4th millennium BC
5th millennium BC
Bronze Age
Chalcolithic
Migrations
Prehistoric migrations